The 1998 Cronulla-Sutherland Sharks season was the 32nd in the club's history. They competed in the NRL's inaugural season. Despite reaching the grand final of the Super League half of the previous season, they failed to make the finals of the re-unified competition.

Ladder

References

Cronulla-Sutherland Sharks seasons
Cronulla-Sutherland Sharks season